Ruperto Cruz Santos, D.D. (born October 30, 1957), is a prelate of the Catholic Church in the Philippines. Santos is the fourth bishop of Balanga since July 8, 2010, succeeding Socrates Villegas who became archbishop of Lingayen-Dagupan on November 4, 2009. He is president of the Episcopal Commission for Pastoral Care for Migrants and Travelers (Ecmi) in Philippines. Since June 5, 2020, he also holds the position as parish priest of St. Nicholas de Tolentino Parish Church in Mariveles, Bataan in a concurrent capacity.

Early life and education
Santos was born on October 30, 1957, in Caingin, San Rafael, Bulacan. His parents are the late Norberto Santos and the late Aurelia Cruz. They are five siblings in the family. He had his primary education at Caingin Elementary School and completed his studies and seminary formation in Our Lady of Guadalupe Minor Seminary (high school) and in San Carlos Seminary in Makati (college and theology) of the Archdiocese of Manila.

Ministry

Priesthood (1983–2010)
He was ordained priest on September 10, 1983, at the Manila Cathedral by Jaime Sin.

After several years in the ministry serving the archdiocese, he was sent to Rome for further studies and took up his Licentiate in Church History in Pontificia Universita Gregoriana. He has been Academic Dean of San Carlos Graduate School of Theology. He also became Rector of Pontificio Collegio Filippino in Rome. In 2003, he became the National Coordinator of the Italian Bishop's Conference for Pastoral Care of Filipino Migrants in Italy. In 2005, he became a member of Pontificio Comitato per i Congressi Eucaristici Internazionali in the Vatican. He has also written a number of books regarding Historical interest published by the Archdiocese of Manila and about Homilies, Prayers, and Spirituality published by St. Paul's (SSP).

Santos previously served as priest of the Archdiocese of Manila from September 10, 1983, until he became Bishop of Balanga in Bataan on July 8, 2010, where he succeeded Socrates Villegas as the latter became archbishop of Lingayen-Dagupan on November 4, 2009. He also previously served as rector of Pontificio Collegio Filippino in Rome, Italy.

Bishop (2010–present)
Pope Benedict XVI named Santos as fourth bishop of Balanga on April 1, 2010, to succeed Socrates Villegas. He was ordained as bishop and consecrated by Cardinal Gaudencio Borbon Rosales, the then Archbishop of Manila, on June 24, 2010, and became bishop of Balanga upon his installation on July 8, 2010. Since he became bishop of Balanga in July 2010, five parishes, and one minor basilica and chapel were created during his term as bishop of the diocese, with Residencia Sacerdotal, Retirement Home for Priests (Our Lady of Guadalupe Chapel) in Taglesville, Balanga was built months after he became bishop of Balanga.

During his term as bishop of Balanga, Santos made 2 quinquennial visit ad limina in Rome which are on December 2, 2010 (five months after he became the diocese's bishop) and May 20, 2019.

Santos also currently holds the position as parish priest of St. Nicholas Tolentino Parish Church in Mariveles, Bataan in a concurrent capacity since June 5, 2020.

Positions held
September 10, 1983–July 8, 2010 - Priest of the Roman Catholic Archdiocese of Manila
2000–July 8, 2010 - Rector of Pontificio Collegio Filippino in Rome, Italy
July 8, 2010–present - Bishop of the Roman Catholic Diocese of Balanga
December 1, 2011–November 30, 2013 - Member, CBCP Migrants and Itinerant People and Chairman, Pontificio Collegio Filippino
December 1, 2013–November 30, 2017 - Vice Chairman, CBCP Commission on the Pontificio Collegio Filipino 
December 1, 2013–November 30, 2019 - Chairman, CBCP Commission for the Pastoral Care of Migrants and Itinerant People
December 1, 2015–November 30, 2019 - CBCP Central Luzon Regional Representative and Member, CBCP Committee for International Congresses
December 1, 2017–November 30, 2019 - Board Member, CBCP Pension Plan Committee and Member, CBCP Commission on Prison Pastoral Care
December 1, 2019–present - Chairman, CBCP Commission on Pontificio Collegio Filippino
June 5, 2020–present - Parish Priest, St. Nicholas of Tolentino Church Mariveles, Bataan
CBCP Bishop Promoter of Stella Maris - Philippines

Coat of arms

See also
 Catholic Church in the Philippines

References

External links
 
 

1957 births
Living people
Filipino bishops
People from Bulacan
Bishops appointed by Pope Benedict XVI